Bufoceratias is a genus of fish in the family Diceratiidae.

Species
There are currently 4 recognized species in this genus:
 Bufoceratias microcephalus H. C. Ho, Kawai & Amaoka, 2016 (Small-head toady seadevil) 
 Bufoceratias shaoi Pietsch, H. C. Ho & H. M. Chen, 2004
 Bufoceratias thele (Uwate, 1979)
 Bufoceratias wedli (Pietschmann, 1926)

References

Diceratiidae
Marine fish genera
Taxa named by Gilbert Percy Whitley